The Sarawak Foundation, also known as Yayasan Sarawak is a statutory body set up to help improve the quality of education of Sarawak. It is often associated with the provision of scholarships and study loans.

History 

The Sarawak Foundation was established on 21 May 1971 through the Yayasan Sarawak Ordinance 1971 by the government of Sarawak. The idea to set up the foundation was mooted by Abdul Rahman Ya'kub, the chief minister of Sarawak at the time. Rahman Ya'kub aimed to improve the standard of education amongst the people of Sarawak, and became the first chairman of the Sarawak Foundation. Datuk Amar Abang Haji Yusuf Puteh, the State Secretary at that time, was appointed as the secretary to the Sarawak Foundation.

As soon as the foundation was established, it was allocated logging concessions. The foundation received RM 5.7 million from logging premiums. In 1978, Yayasan Sarawak received RM 26.9 million in total revenues and spent RM 12.0 million. Yayasan Sarawak also received 20% shares from Utama Banking group (a subsidiary of Cahya Mata Sarawak Berhad). In 1979, Yayasan Sarawak gave scholarships and loans to 377 students. From these students, 126 of them graduated from various fields such as engineering, economy, law, and others.

As of 2014, a total of RM 600 million was disbursed 150,000 students and benefactors cumulatively. The foundation also set aside RM 60 to RM 70 million per year to help needy students.

In 2019, Sarawak government started on a scheme to help Sarawakians to pay Perbadanan Tabung Pendidikan Tinggi Nasional (PTPTN) (a study loan introduced by the Malaysian federal government) for those have difficulties in repayments. In 2022, Sarawak Foundation dished out RM 3.5 million to PTPTN. In 2019, the Sarawak government started a plan to build international schools throughout Sarawak. The first international school was launched in Petra Jaya in 2022.

Activities and core businesses 

Yayasan Sarawak offers several scholarship programmes for local and foreign universities admissions, including Yayasan Sarawak Tun Taib Scholarship for Science, technology, engineering, and mathematics (STEM) subjects,  Sarawak Tunku Abdul Rahman Scholarship Foundation (YBSTAR) for non-STEM subjects, UNIMAS medical programme scholarship, Sarawak Foundation Local Scholarship for secondary school studies, and admission assistance to tertiary or other institutions of higher learning.

Yayasan Sarawak also offers several loans such as local education scholarship loan, overseas education loan, technical training scholarship loan and Sarawak higher education loan (HiED). HiED is specifically offered for those pursuing  engineering & quantity surveying subjects.

Programs and assistance 
 Yayasan Sarawak Exchange Program
 Community Education Program
 School Uniform Assistance
 High Performing Rural Schools (HiPERS)
 Reading Materials Assistance Program
 Yayasan Sarawak Student Excellence Awards
 Sarawak Chief Minister Special Awards (AKKMS)
 YS-JPNS Collaboration Program

Loan repayment 
 Loan Repayment Method
 Loan Repayment Incentive

References

Foundations based in Malaysia
Educational foundations
Sarawak State Government Agency